List of people with the surname Abram.

Benjamin Abram (1846–1938), French lawyer and politician
Darren Abram (born 1967), English rugby league coach
David Abram (born 1957), American philosopher and ecologist
Felicity Abram (born 1986), Australian triathlete
Fletcher Abram (born 1950), American handball player
Ido Abram (1940–2019), Indonesian academic
Jacques Abram (1915–1998), American classical pianist
John Abram (born 1959), Canadian composer
Johnathan Abram (born 1997), American football player
Lester Abram (born 1983), American basketball player
Luis Abram (born 1996), Peruvian football player
Michael "Mad Mick" Abram (born 1966), attempted to kill George Harrison on December 30, 1999
Morris B. Abram (1918–2000), American lawyer, civil rights activist, and academic
Nerilie Abram (born 1977), Australian climate scientist
Norm Abram (born 1949), American carpenter
Syd Abram (1906–1988), English rugby player